On the Happy Side was a long-playing vinyl album recorded by Bing Crosby for his own company, Project Records and issued by Warner Bros. Records (W1482) in 1962. The album is in a “sing along” style and Crosby over-dubbed his vocals on accompaniment recorded in London earlier in April 1962.  The musical arrangements were by Bob Thompson, Jack Halloran and Peter Matz. The album was issued on CD for the first time in 2017 by Sepia Records.

Reception

Billboard said: “This is one of Bing’s best albums in some time. He sings a collection of old favorites in straight style, aided by good ork arrangements…Good songs, well sung, and plenty of time, should help this set sell."

Track listing

References 

1962 albums
Bing Crosby albums
Albums arranged by Bob Thompson (musician)
Albums arranged by Peter Matz
Warner Records albums